Agustín Blessing Presinger (11 May 1868 – 1 February 1934) was a German priest, bishop, and missionary. He was the first known European to reach to the summit of Mount Chirripó in 1904.

Biography
Presinger was born on May 11, 1868. He became a priest on February 24, 1894. Presinger became the first to reach the peak of Mount Chirripó, the highest peak of Costa Rica, in 1904. He became Bishop of Limón on May 1, 1922, and died on February 1, 1934.

References

1868 births
1934 deaths
19th-century German Roman Catholic priests
20th-century Roman Catholic bishops in Costa Rica
Roman Catholic bishops of Limón